Connoquenessing Creek is a tributary of the Beaver River, approximately 50 mi (80 km) long, in Western Pennsylvania in the United States.

Course

Connoquenessing Creek rises in eastern Butler County and flows southwest, through the Lake Oneida reservoir and past Butler, then west-northwest in a meandering course past Eidenau where Breakneck Creek is received, and then continuing past Harmony and Zelienople. It receives Slippery Rock Creek from the northwest near Ellwood City, then joins the Beaver west of Ellwood City, approximately 3 mi (5 km) further downstream.

Watershed

In 2000, a scientific study was conducted to determine the health of the creek.  Researchers discovered that only the Mississippi River received more toxic materials than the Connoquenessing, making the small river the second most polluted waterway in the United States.  "The Armco Inc. steel facility in Butler, purchased last September [1999] by AK Steel, ranked first nationally for the amount of pollutant discharges. The steelmaker legally discharged more than 29 million pounds of nitrate compounds -- a waste produced when nitric acid is used to "pickle" or clean the surface of raw steel—into Connoquenessing Creek."

However, as of 2010, the Connoquenessing Creek was not listed in the national Top 10 for polluted waterways.  Also, as of 2010, Armco Inc. steel in Butler was not listed in the Top 20 in regards to national pollutant dischargers.

The creek is a popular canoeing and kayaking destination, with many boaters entering the creek at various locations.

See also
List of rivers of Pennsylvania

References

External links
U.S. Geological Survey: PA stream gaging stations
Penn State Univ.: Geology of Butler County

Rivers of Pennsylvania
Tributaries of the Beaver River
Rivers of Beaver County, Pennsylvania
Rivers of Butler County, Pennsylvania
Rivers of Lawrence County, Pennsylvania
Allegheny Plateau